Lake Allpacocha (possibly from Quechua allpa earth, qucha lake), Lake Japracocha or Lake Japrucocha is a lake in the Cordillera Blanca in the Andes of Peru. It is situated in the Ancash Region, Huari Province, in the southeast of the Chavín de Huantar District. Lake Allpacocha lies in the Huascarán National Park, near Mount Gajap.

References 

Lakes of Peru
Lakes of Ancash Region